Ben Guecha is a town and commune in Taleb Larbi District, El Oued Province, Algeria. According to the 2008 census it has a population of 2,513, up from 1,036 in 1998, with an annual growth rate of 9.5%, the highest in the province.

Climate

Ben Guecha has a hot desert climate (Köppen climate classification BWh), with very hot summers and mild winters, and very little precipitation throughout the year.

Transportation
The town of Ben Guecha lies in the isolated far north-eastern corner of El Oued Province. A local road leads to the N16 which connects El Oued to Tebessa.

Education

2.1% of the population has a tertiary education, and another 8.6% has completed secondary education. The overall literacy rate is 52.2%, and is 60.8% among males and 43.4% among females; all three figures are the second lowest in the province after Douar El Ma.

Localities
The commune of Ben Guecha is composed of 17 localities:

Ben Guecha
Douilat
Rass Touneb
Ben Younès
El Babouche
Bouhabline
El Ogla
Bir Souamèche
Djourara
Biar El Jouder
Laklabia
Chott El Khala
El Ammari
El Houche
Ogla Dhafria
Foum El Gharsa
Mekhatih

References

Neighbouring towns and cities

Communes of El Oued Province